Demi Lardner is an Australian absurdist comedian based in Sydney. In 2013, she won Raw Comedy in Melbourne and went on to win So You Think You're Funny? in Edinburgh for her comedy set. She regularly streams on Twitch, and co-hosts the podcast bigsofttitty.png with Tom Walker.

Early life 
Lardner grew up in Adelaide, South Australia.

Career 
Lardner began performing in Adelaide at open mics at 15, and won Adelaide Comedy's Rising Starr Award for Best Newcomer in 2010. In 2013, she won the Raw Comedy national competition and earned a place in that year's So You Think You're Funny? competition at Edinburgh Festival Fringe, which she won in a tie. Lardner co-wrote and performed in Wolf Creek, The Musical, which won BankSA's Best Emerging Comedy Show Award at Adelaide Fringe. That year she also won Adelaide Comedy's Out of Adelaide award and was nominated for their Adelaide Comedian of the Year award.

Lardner's comedy has been described as surreal and absurdist. She performed in Limbless Cagefighter in 2014, and was nominated for Adelaide Comedy's Adelaide Comedian of the Year and Out of Adelaide awards. In 2015 she performed in her first solo show Birds with Human Lips, as well as in Angus and Demi are: Best Good Show with Angus Brown. She also began the podcast We Are Not Doctors with Bart Freebairn in 2015, which ended after its 100th episode in 2017.

Lardner's 2016 solo show Life Mechanic led to her receiving the Sydney Comedy Festival's Best Newcomer Award as joint winner and being nominated for Melbourne International Comedy Festival's Best Newcomer award. Her 2017 show Look What You Made Me Do, directed and co-written by Mark Bonanno, received the Directors' Choice award at the Melbourne International Comedy Festival and the Underbelly Edinburgh Award at Adelaide Fringe.

In 2018 Lardner's show I Love Skeleton won the Pinder Prize at Melbourne International Comedy Festival. She also began the podcast bigsofttitty.png with Tom Walker, which was picked up by Sanspants Radio Podcast Network later that year.

Her 2019 solo show Ditch Witch 800 won Best International Show at the New Zealand International Comedy Festival, and was nominated for Edinburgh Fringe's Best Show and for Edinburgh Comedy Awards' Best Comedy Show. Also in 2019, Lardner performed alongside Tom Walker in We Mustn't, which received Sydney Comedy Festival's Director's Choice Award. Walker and Lardner began their second podcast We Have No Strong Feelings About Harry Potter that year, which was also on the Sanspants Radio Podcast Network. The podcast ended in 2020.

While she had previously occasionally streamed on Twitch, Lardner began to stream regularly in 2020 with COVID-19 restrictions preventing live shows.

Personal life 
A few years after beginning comedy, Lardner moved to Sydney.

Lardner is openly bisexual. She has been involved in LGBT+ awareness initiatives, such as a Triple J interview about her parents' responses when she came out to them, and creating a satirical public service announcement in October 2018, addressing recent national debate about the rights of religious schools regarding LGBT+ employees and students.

References

External links 
 

Living people
21st-century Australian comedians
Australian stand-up comedians
Australian women comedians
Australian women podcasters
Australian podcasters
Comedians from Sydney
Bisexual comedians
Twitch (service) streamers
Year of birth missing (living people)
21st-century LGBT people
People from Adelaide